Zirkelbach is a surname.  Notable people with the surname include:

 Christian Zirkelbach (born 1961), West German sprinter
 Ray Zirkelbach (born 1978), American politician, prison counselor, and soldier